is the title character and protagonist of the Viewtiful Joe series. While normally a regular person named Joe, he obtains the ability to transform into Viewtiful Joe by entering a movie and gaining the ability from an older superhero named Captain Blue in order to save his girlfriend, Silvia. He was created by the game's director, Hideki Kamiya, and illustrated by Kumiko Suekane. In the video games he is voiced by Dee Bradley Baker, while he is voiced by Jason Palmer and Tomokazu Seki in the English and Japanese dubs of the anime series respectively. 

Joe has appeared in several video games, both in his series and in spin-off material. He first appeared in Viewtiful Joe, where he obtained his signature costume and abilities. This release was followed by two sequels titled Viewtiful Joe 2 and Viewtiful Joe: Double Trouble!; in the first, Joe is teamed with Silvia, who has become the superhero Sexy Silvia. One more game was released in the series titled Viewtiful Joe: Red Hot Rumble, a fighting spin-off game featuring Joe amongst other characters from the series. Joe has appeared in three other fighting games from Capcom: Tatsunoko vs. Capcom: Ultimate All-Stars, Marvel vs. Capcom 3: Fate of Two Worlds, and Ultimate Marvel vs. Capcom 3. Joe has received generally positive reception.

Concept and creation
Joe's character design, created by Kumiko Suekane, was inspired specifically by 1960s and 1970s Japanese-costumed tokusatsu television shows such as Kamen Rider and Ultraman. The design is most akin to the Tatsunoko Productions hero, Casshern. The protagonist of Viewtiful Joe was originally going to be a cute and innocent-looking character who had great physical prowess and super powers, but the developers found this boring and went with a cooler character.  In its earliest stages of development, the character went under the working title "Red Hot Man", but the name was changed due to copyright conflicts with the American rock band Red Hot Chili Peppers. When designing the star of the video game Bayonetta, Kamiya described two of his characters, Joe and Dante from Devil May Cry as a mischievous kid and a tough guy respectively, and that he wanted to create a different character from these archetypes.

Characteristics
Viewtiful Joe has the power to slow down the movie, speed it up, and to zoom into the picture, much like camera effects seen in movies. At first, he is only able to use his powers in movies; however in Viewtiful Joe 2, he demonstrated, when in the real world, that his V-Watch will respond when in front of an audience, enabling him to transform outside of the movie. His inability is again apparent in Viewtiful Joe: Double Trouble! when he attempts to transform with nobody around; this is solved when Silvia points her special camcorder, The V-Cam, at Joe. Joe's arsenal also includes Voomerangs, a boomerang-like blade weapon thrown from Joe's helmet; and Shocking Pink, which is a short fused bomb.

Appearances
His first appearance was in the 2003 video game Viewtiful Joe for the Nintendo GameCube, which was later ported to PlayStation 2. Joe first gains his super hero persona when he is taken into the film world and is granted it by aged super hero Captain Blue. After battling several super villains, he discovers that Captain Blue is the true villain, and defeats him. He appears in the sequel, Viewtiful Joe 2, along with his girlfriend, who now goes by the name Sexy Silvia. Joe is voiced by Dee Bradley Baker in both games. Joe also stars in the spin-off title Viewtiful Joe: Double Trouble! and is a playable fighter in both his Viewtiful and normal "Movie Fan" forms in  Viewtiful Joe: Red Hot Rumble. Joe is a playable character in the Wii version of the 2008 fighting game Tatsunoko vs. Capcom: Cross Generation of Heroes and its update, Tatsunoko vs. Capcom: Ultimate All-Stars, where his VFX Powers form some of his special moves. He also appears as a playable character in Marvel vs. Capcom 3: Fate of Two Worlds and Ultimate Marvel vs. Capcom 3. Joe appears in the mobile game, Combo Crew as a playable character.

In other media
Joe appears as the main protagonist of the Viewtiful Joe anime series, voiced by Tomokazu Seki in Japanese and Jason Palmer in English. The show loosely adapts the events of the first two games, with Joe battling to rescue Silvia from the Jadow organization, then later fighting to stop the Black Emperor and his Gedow soldiers. Unlike the games, Joe is accompanied in most episodes by Captain Blue Jr., an original character who acts as Joe's sidekick.

Joe also appears in Archie Comics' Worlds Unite crossover between its Mega Man and Sonic the Hedgehog titles, where he and Silvia are among the many Capcom and Sega heroes recruited to battle Sigma.

Reception
Since appearing in Viewtiful Joe, Joe has received generally positive reception. IGN suggested Joe as a likely choice for inclusion in Super Smash Bros. series, pointing out that many fans had similar sentiments. Nintendo Power listed Joe as their 12th favourite hero, saying that he has an inimitable style and introduced the memorable quote "Henshin-a-go-go, baby!". Including him in the 2013 list of "The 30 best Capcom characters of the last 30 years", GamesRadar staff commented that "The character starred in a quick succession of games, then vanished almost as fast as he became popular, but recent guest appearances in Capcom crossover games have given the hero a new lease on life." GameDaily listed him as the ninth best Capcom character, citing in part his carefree style. However, they also listed him as character that make people want to mute their games, commenting that while he was initially an interesting character due to being an "average joe" who turns into a superhero, his voice quickly became irritating. Similarly, Complex listed him as the 19th most annoying character in video games, noting the fact that he repeats "Henshin a go go" a lot, and stating that "The game might have been dope, but the title character needed to go. He was the worst thing about it."

References

Beat 'em up characters
Capcom protagonists
Fictional characters who can manipulate time
Male characters in anime and manga
Male characters in video games
Parody superheroes
Video game characters introduced in 2003
Video game characters who can move at superhuman speeds
Video game characters with superhuman strength
Video game superheroes
Viewtiful Joe